ARA Buenos Aires was a protected cruiser of the Argentine Navy. It was built by the British shipyard of Armstrong Mitchell and Co, being launched in 1895 and completing in 1896. Buenos Aires continued in use until 1932.

Construction
In February 1893, Armstrong and Mitchell laid down a protected cruiser (Yard No. 612) at its Elswick, Newcastle upon Tyne shipyard as a stock ship (i.e. without an order from a customer). The ship soon found a buyer, with Argentina, involved in dispute with Chile over the border between the two nations in Patagonia, purchasing the ship on 27 November 1893, and named it Buenos Aires.

Gunnery trials followed on 29 November that year. The ship was completed in February 1896, and reaching Argentina on 29 April 1896.

Design
Buenos Aires was of similar design to the Chilean cruiser Blanco Encalada, the previous protected cruiser built by Armstrong and Mitchell, but with a modified armament. Like Blanco Encalada, Buenos Aires had a flush deck layout, and its hull was wood and copper sheathed to reduce fouling. The ship displaced .Chesneau and Kolesnik 1979, pp. 403, 412.

The ship was powered by two 4-cylinder triple-expansion steam engines fed by eight horizontal return tube boilers and driving two propeller shafts. This machinery was designed to give  with natural draught and  under forced draught, but managed to generate  under natural draught during trials.

The ship's main armament consisted of two 8 inch (203 mm) /45 calibre guns (compared to the 40 calibre guns fitted to Blanco Encalada), mounted fore and aft behind shields on the ship's centreline. Secondary armament consisted of a mixed battery of four 6 inch (152 mm) /45 calibre and six 4.7 inch (120 mm) /45 calibre quick-firing guns, (compared to the ten 6 inch /40 calibre guns mounted on Blanco Encalada) which could fire  and  shells at a rate of 7 rounds per minute and 10 rounds per minute respectively. Tertiary armament consisted of sixteen three-pounder (47 mm) guns, while six QF 1-pounder pom-pom automatic guns were mounted on the ship's fighting tops. Five 18 inch torpedo tubes were fitted, one fixed in the box and four on the ship's broadside.The Engineer 31 July 1896, p. 106.

Operational history
After arriving in Argentina, Buenos Aires joined the 1st Division of the fleet. The ship settled into a routine of naval exercises, interspersed with use as a survey ship. In 1906, the ship returned to the United Kingdom for refurbishment of its armament, while in 1911, it again returned to Britain to participate in the Fleet review at Spithead to celebrate the coronation of King George V.

In 1926, Buenos Aires transported a four-man Spanish Air Force crew which included Major Ramón Franco and copilot/navigator Captain Julio Ruiz de Alda Miqueleiz from Argentina to a hero′s welcome in Spain. Between 22 January and 10 February 1926, the aviators had made a seven-stop, 6,300-mile (10,145-kilometer) flight of just under 51 hours from Spain to Buenos Aires in the Dornier Do J Wal ("Whale") flying boat Plus Ultra ("Farther Still").Buenos Aires'' was stricken on 17 May 1932, and sold for scrapping in 1935.

Notes and references

Notes

Citations

References

See also 
 List of cruisers
 List of ships of the Argentine Navy

Further reading

External links 

 

Cruisers of the Argentine Navy
Ships built by Armstrong Whitworth
1895 ships